Eric Leslie Watson (11 September 1893 – January 1971) was an Australian rules footballer who played with Fitzroy in the Victorian Football League (VFL).

Fitzroy (VFL)
He made his debut, as one of the seven new players for Fitzroy — i.e., Ernie Everett, Jack Furness, Cliff Hutton, Frank Lamont, Tom Moloughney, Danny Murphy, and Eric Watson — against Melbourne on 29 April 1911.

Notes

External links 
		

1971 deaths
1893 births
Australian rules footballers from Victoria (Australia)
Fitzroy Football Club players